Guy Ramsay Fieri (né Ferry; born January 22, 1968) is an American restaurateur, author, and an Emmy Award winning television presenter. He co-owns three restaurants in California, licenses his name to restaurants in New York City and Las Vegas, and is known for hosting various television series on the Food Network. By 2010, The New York Times reported that Fieri had become the "face of the network", bringing an "element of rowdy, mass-market culture to American food television" and that his "prime-time shows attract more male viewers than any others on the network".

Early life
Fieri was born Guy Ramsay Ferry on January 22, 1968, in Columbus, Ohio, the son of Penelope Anne (née Price) and Lewis James Ferry. He grew up in Ferndale in rural Humboldt County, California. During high school, he was a foreign exchange student in France, where he developed his interest in food and cooking.

Fieri attended the University of Nevada, Las Vegas, and graduated with a Bachelor of Science in Hotel Management in 1990.

Career
Fieri began his association with food in grade school in Ferndale, by selling pretzels from his "Awesome Pretzel" cart and washing dishes to finance his trip to France to study. On his return to the United States, he worked at the restaurant at the Red Lion Inn in Eureka, California, until he went to Las Vegas for college.

Soon after graduation from college, he worked as manager of Parker's Lighthouse, a Stouffer's restaurant in Long Beach, California. After three years in southern California, he became district manager of Louise's Trattoria, managing six locations along with recruiting and training for the restaurants.
 In 2013 Fieri received a Daytime Emmy Award for Outstanding Special Class Special for the Food Network special Guy Fieri's Family Reunion.

Restaurants
In late 1996, Fieri and business partner Steve Gruber opened Johnny Garlic's, a "California Pasta Grill" in Santa Rosa, California.  A second location opened in Windsor in 1999, a third in Petaluma in 2000 or 2001 (since closed), and a fourth in Roseville in late 2008. Subsequently, they developed Tex Wasabi's (barbecue and sushi) in 2003 in Santa Rosa, adding a second location in Sacramento's Arden-Arcade area in 2007 (which was rebranded as Johnny Garlic's, and then subsequently closed). An additional Johnny Garlic's was opened in Dublin, California, in 2011.

Fieri's first New York City restaurant, Guy's American Kitchen and Bar, opened in 2012 to brutal New York Times coverage by Pete Wells that Larry Olmsted of Forbes called "the most scathing review in the history of the New York Times", and "likely the most widely read restaurant review ever." Fieri, for his part, accused Wells, the nation's highest profile reviewer, of using Fieri's fame as a platform for advancing his own prestige. The restaurant's location in the highly trafficked Times Square enabled it to appear on Restaurant Business's list of the top 100 independent restaurants as ranked by sales for four years in a row. It closed at the end of 2017.

In 2011, Fieri partnered with Carnival Cruise lines to create Guy's Burger Joint to sell Fieri's burgers fleet-wide. As of October 2017, there were 19 restaurants on Carnival's cruise ships, including some serving beer-and-BBQ, Guy's Pig & Anchor Smokehouse Brewhouse.

In April 2014, Guy Fieri's Vegas Kitchen and Bar opened in Las Vegas.
In 2015, Guy Fieri's Baltimore Kitchen & Bar opened in Baltimore's Horseshoe Casino. In 2018, Fieri collaborated with Planet Hollywood founder Robert Earl to open fast-food chicken sandwich shop Chicken Guy! at Disney Springs in Walt Disney World.

Television
After winning the second season of The Next Food Network Star on April 23, 2006, Fieri was awarded a six-episode commitment for his own cooking show on Food Network. Guy's Big Bite premiered on June 25, 2006, with the most recent episode airing on November 16, 2016.

Diners, Drive-Ins and Dives, his second series, premiered in April 2007 (a one-hour special aired in November 2006), with Fieri traveling the country visiting local eateries. The New York Times called the series "not a cooking show as much as a carefully engineered reality show". Ultimate Recipe Showdown, co-hosted with Marc Summers, debuted on February 17, 2008, and aired for three seasons. On September 14, 2008, Guy Off the Hook debuted on Food Network. This special studio audience show aired through the end of 2008, but the extra cost of staging an audience show did not result in a ratings bump and the concept was discontinued. For Thanksgiving 2008, Fieri hosted a one-hour special titled Guy's Family Feast. He used the "Guy Off the Hook" set for the special, which was broadcast live, on November 28, 2008. Fieri appeared on other Food Network programs such as Dinner: Impossible in 2007 and 2009, Paula's Party, Ace of Cakes, and The Best Thing I Ever Ate.

In December 2009, NBC named Fieri as the host of the game show Minute to Win It, which premiered in March 2010 and aired for two seasons. On May 13, 2012, NBC announced that the game show would not be renewed for a third season, citing high production costs and low ratings.

In January 2012, Fieri was one of the two team captains (along with Rachael Ray) in the Food Network reality series Rachael vs. Guy: Celebrity Cook-Off. A second season of Rachael vs. Guy: Celebrity Cook-Off began airing on Food Network on January 6, 2013. A chef challenge show, Guy's Grocery Games, started on October 27, 2013, on the Food Network. It features four cooks who battle through three rounds, and are judged by three judges.

His series, Guy's Family Road Trip, was chosen as the 2017 lead-out show from season 13 of Food Network Star.  It previewed on August 13 of that year.

In May 2021, Fieri signed a three-year contract with Food Network worth an estimated $80 million.

Advertising
Fieri appeared in promotions for Flowmaster, a California-based auto exhaust parts manufacturer. In 2008 and 2009, he was the spokesperson for T.G.I. Friday's.  In 2010, he appeared in a commercial for Aflac named "Spicy".

Other projects
In 2009, Fieri began touring with the Guy Fieri Roadshow, a multi-state food tour that featured some of his fellow Food Network personalities. He also appeared in regional Food Network events, such as the 2012 Atlantic City Food and Wine Festival and the 2012 South Beach Food and Wine Festival, where he officiated at 101 gay weddings.

In 2015, Fieri officiated at the wedding of celebrity chef Art Smith at Miami Beach. The wedding, which included 101 same-sex couples, was held to celebrate Florida's Supreme Court lifting the state ban on same-sex marriage. Fieri officiated the weddings in honor of his late sister who was a lesbian.

Fieri owns a vineyard and sells his wine under the label Hunt & Ryde, named after his sons Hunter and Ryder.

In response to the COVID-19 pandemic's effect on the restaurant industry in 2020, Fieri teamed up with the National Restaurant Association Educational Foundation to raise money for unemployed restaurant workers through newly created Restaurant Employee Relief Fund. In under two months over US$20 million was raised.

Personal life

Fieri met his wife Lori when she came into a restaurant he was managing in Long Beach, California. The couple married in 1995 and Ferry changed his surname to Fieri in memory of his paternal grandfather, Giuseppe Fieri, an Italian immigrant who had anglicized his surname to Ferry upon his arrival in the United States. They live in Santa Rosa, California, with their sons, Hunter and Ryder and their nephew Jules. Fieri's sister died in 2011 of metastatic melanoma and Fieri decided to take care of the 11-year old Jules. The Fieris bought a home in West Palm Beach, Florida, in 2021.

He collects classic American cars, including a 1971 Chevrolet Chevelle, a 1968 Pontiac Firebird, a 1976 Jeep CJ-5, a 1969 Chevrolet Impala SS, and a 1967 Chevrolet C10 pickup.

Filmography

Books 
Fieri is the author or co-author of several cookbooks which together were New York Times bestsellers for a total of over 33 weeks.

See also
List of celebrities who own wineries and vineyards

References

External links

 
 Guy Fieri's Biography at FoodNetwork.com
 Guy Fieri's profile and diary from The Next Food Network Star at FoodNetwork.com
 Guy's Burger Joint
 
 "The Genius of Guy Fieri" – Esquire

1968 births
American game show hosts
American people of Italian descent
American restaurateurs
American television chefs
American male chefs
Food Network chefs
Food Network Star winners
Living people
People from Ferndale, California
People from Santa Rosa, California
William F. Harrah College of Hotel Administration alumni
Writers from Columbus, Ohio